Ponley is a commune (khum) in Angkor Borei District, Takéo Province, Cambodia.

Administration 
As of 2019, the commune has 6 villages (phums) as follows.

References 

Communes of Takéo province
Angkor Borei District